Lincoln McCarthy (born 22 October 1993) is a professional Australian rules football player for the Brisbane Lions in the Australian Football League (AFL).

McCarthy, from Bordertown, South Australia, was recruited from Glenelg to Geelong in the 2011 National Draft with pick 66. He made his debut in round 10, 2012, against  at Kardinia Park. It was his sole game for the 2012 season; he did not play in the 2013 season after undergoing foot surgery. McCarthy played four games in 2014, struggling with a back injury. He suffered another foot injury in 2015. McCarthy played 19 games in 2016 before he was struck down by hip and groin problems in 2017. He played two games in 2018 and was traded to Brisbane at the conclusion of the 2018 season.

Statistics
Updated to the end of the 2022 season.

|-
| 2012 ||  || 6
| 1 || 0 || 0 || 3 || 3 || 6 || 3 || 0 || 0.0 || 0.0 || 3.0 || 3.0 || 6.0 || 3.0 || 0.0 || 0
|-
| 2013 ||  || 6
| 0 || — || — || — || — || — || — || — || — || — || — || — || — || — || — || –
|-
| 2014 ||  || 6
| 4 || 0 || 5 || 24 || 16 || 40 || 5 || 11 || 0.0 || 1.3 || 6.0 || 4.0 || 10.0 || 1.3 || 2.8 || 0
|-
| 2015 ||  || 6
| 0 || — || — || — || — || — || — || — || — || — || — || — || — || — || — || –
|-
| 2016 ||  || 6
| 19 || 19 || 7 || 122 || 87 || 209 || 49 || 49 || 1.0 || 0.4 || 6.4 || 4.6 || 11.0 || 2.6 || 2.6 || 0
|-
| 2017 ||  || 6
| 3 || 4 || 1 || 24 || 16 || 40 || 6 || 8 || 1.3 || 0.3 || 8.0 || 5.3 || 13.3 || 2.0 || 2.7 || 0
|-
| 2018 ||  || 6
| 2 || 2 || 3 || 14 || 8 || 22 || 5 || 4 || 1.0 || 1.5 || 7.0 || 4.0 || 11.0 || 2.5 || 2.0 || 0
|-
| 2019 ||  || 11
| 24 || 20 || 13 || 179 || 135 || 314 || 70 || 94 || 0.8 || 0.5 || 7.5 || 5.6 || 13.1 || 2.9 || 3.9 || 2
|-
| 2020 ||  || 11
| 17 || 15 || 15 || 89 || 76 || 165 || 40 || 53 || 0.9 || 0.9 || 5.2 || 4.5 || 9.7 || 2.4 || 3.1 || 0
|-
| 2021 ||  || 11
| 24 || 36 || 15 || 183 || 123 || 306 || 77 || 80 || 1.5 || 0.6 || 7.6 || 5.1 || 12.8 || 3.2 || 3.3 || 3
|-
| 2022 ||  || 11
| 25 || 35 || 13 || 199 || 110 || 309 || 89 || 83 || 1.4 || 0.5 || 8.0 || 4.4 || 12.4 || 3.6 || 3.3 || 1
|- class=sortbottom
! colspan=3 | Career
! 119 !! 131 !! 72 !! 837 !! 574 !! 1411 !! 344 !! 382 !! 1.1 !! 0.6 !! 7.0 !! 4.8 !! 11.9 !! 2.9 !! 3.2 !! 6
|}

Notes

References

External links

1993 births
Living people
Geelong Football Club players
Australian rules footballers from South Australia
Brisbane Lions players